Briar Creek or Brier Creek may refer to:

Streams
Brier Creek (Savannah River tributary), in Georgia, U.S.
Brier Creek (Susquehanna River tributary), in Otsego County, New York, U.S.
Briar Creek (Susquehanna River tributary), in Pennsylvania, U.S.
East Branch Briar Creek
West Branch Briar Creek
Brier Creek (Big Coal River tributary), in West Virginia, U.S.

Places
Briar Creek, Pennsylvania, U.S.
Briar Creek Township, Columbia County, Pennsylvania, U.S.

See also

Battle of Brier Creek, an American Revolutionary War battle in the U.S. state of Georgia